Xam'd: Lost Memories, known in Japan as , is an anime series, conceptualized by Bones and co-developed by Sony Computer Entertainment, Aniplex and Bones, which made its debut on Sony's inaugural launch of the PlayStation Network (PSN) video download service at E3 in the United States on July 16, 2008, in Japan on September 24, 2008.

Plot

Sentan Island exists in a state of dreamlike tranquility, surrounded by the Yuden Sea, cut off from the war between the Northern Government and the Southern Continent Free Zone. Akiyuki Takehara lives on Sentan Island along with his mother Fusa. Despite his mother's strained relationship with his father, Ryuzo, the town doctor, the bond between father and son remains strong.

One day the island's tranquility is shattered, when Akiyuki, along with his best friends Haru and Furuichi, are caught up in an explosion on a school bus by a mysterious pale, white haired girl named Nazuna. The explosion produces a mysterious light which enters Akiyuki's arm and a blue gem appears. With no time to understand what has happened, and a brief exchange between Nazuna and Akiyuki is transformed into a creature called Xam'd. As Xam'd, Akiyuki uses his newfound powers to fight off monstrous invading forces to save Haru, only to be stopped by a mysterious girl who offers him a choice: come with her and live, or stay and turn to stone. Accepting her offer, Akiyuki embarks on a journey of discovery that will take him to new lands, and help him understand the connection between himself and the world of Xam'd.

Production
 Original: Bones
 Director: Masayuki Miyaji
 Main screenwriters: Megumi Shimizu, Yuichi Nomura
 Animation director (direction and layout checks): Masashi Okumura
 Character design & Chief animation director: Ayumi Kurashima
 Xam'd mechanical design & Chief animation director: Seiichi Hashimoto
 Mechanical design: Kimitoshi Yamane
 Humanoid weapons mechanical design: Kenji Mizuhata
 Art director: Takashi Aoi
 Color settings: Hiroko Umesaki
 Cinematographer: Yōhei Miyahara, Tōru Fukushi
 Editing: Kumiko Sakamoto
 Music: Michiru Oshima
 Music production: Aniplex
 Animation production: Bones
 Production: Sony Computer Entertainment, Inc., Aniplex, Bones

Media

Anime

The series received its television premiere across Japan on MBS, CBC, Tokyo MX and other Japanese broadcast networks from April 2009, featuring new opening and ending theme sequences. Xam'd: Lost Memories spanned a total of 26 episodes. On its launch week, its pilot episode was the most downloaded video on the PlayStation Network at E3. On June 24, 2010, Sentai Filmworks announced that it had sub-licensed the series for home video distribution across North America, where the first half season set was released on DVD and Blu-ray Disc on September 21, 2010. The second set was released on November 9, 2010 on DVD and Blu-ray.

Manga
The manga adaptation of the series, written by Masahiro Kawanabe, began serialization in Ace Assault and Shōnen Ace since December 9, 2008, after it began release on PSN Japan.

Music
The score to the series is composed by Michiru Oshima, known for her work on the Godzilla movie franchise and the Fullmetal Alchemist anime series. For both the 2008 PlayStation Network download distribution and the 2009 television broadcast, the Japanese electronic rock band Boom Boom Satellites performed the opening themes while Japanese-American vocalist Kylee made her debut performing the ending themes. For the PSN distribution, the opening was "Shut Up and Explode" from the Boom Boom Satellites' 2007 album Exposed and the ending was "Vacancy". For the syndicated TV broadcasts, the Boom Boom Satellites' 2009 single "Back on My Feet" was used as an opening theme and Kylee's songs "Just Breathe" and "Over U" were used as ending themes. For the TV broadcasts, both the old PSN and new TV themes were used in different combinations, each with different animation sequences.

References

External links
  Xam'd: Lost Memories official website
 
 ANN review

2008 anime ONAs
Anime with original screenplays
Aniplex
Bones (studio)
Fantasy anime and manga
Kadokawa Shoten manga
Mecha anime and manga
PlayStation 3
Sentai Filmworks
Shōnen manga
Sony Interactive Entertainment franchises
Sony Interactive Entertainment